This is a list of mayors (Stadtpräsident) of Uster, Canton of Zürich, Switzerland.

Uster
Mayors of Uster, List
Uster
 
Lists of mayors (complete 1900-2013)